Moerani Bouzige (born 13 July 1999) is an Australian tennis player.

Bouzige has a career high ATP singles ranking of 741 achieved on 29 November 2021.

Bouzige made his ATP main draw debut at the 2022 Sydney International after receiving a wildcard into the doubles main draw with Matthew Romios.

Bouzige's mother is from Tahiti, whilst his father is from France.

Career

2017-2020: Career beginnings 
Bouzige made his debut on the ITF tour in September 2017 at the Australia F4.

2021-present: ITF titles and ATP debut
Bouzige won his first ITF title in October 2021 and second the following month.

Bouzige made his ATP main draw debut at the 2022 Sydney International after receiving a wildcard into the doubles main draw with Matthew Romios.

ITF Circuit finals

Singles: 3 (2 title)

References

External links

1999 births
Living people
Sportspeople from the Gold Coast, Queensland
Australian male tennis players
Tennis people from the Gold Coast
Australian people of French descent
Australian people of French Polynesian descent
21st-century Australian people